An election to Comhairle nan Eilean Siar was held on 6 May 1999 as part of the wider 1999 Scottish local elections.

The council, formerly known as Western Isles Council, had been renamed in 1997 in Gaelic as Comhairle nan Eilean Siar. Council ward boundaries had also been changed since the previous election, and the total number of wards was increased from 30 to 31.

The election was the first since 1994. Whilst the new Scottish councils had seen elections in 1995, the three Island Councils (Western Isles, Shetland and Orkney) had not, as they had not been affected by the abolition of the regional and district levels of governance in Scotland. The Island Councils had instead utilised a unitary system, like that adopted by the other Scottish councils in 1995, since their inception.

The Scottish National Party ran candidates for the first time, gaining four seats.

Aggregate results

Ward results

References

1999 Scottish local elections
1999